Avraham Gileadi (born October 24, 1940) is a Dutch-born American scholar and professor specializing in the Hebrew language and analysis of Book of Isaiah. A longtime professor at Brigham Young University, he was one of the "September Six" of prominent scholars excommunicated by the Church of Jesus Christ of Latter-day Saints in 1993, but several years later Gileadi was formally readmitted into the church and insists that his excommunication was recognized by church leadership as "a mistake".

Biography

Early life and education
Gileadi was born in 1940 in the Netherlands during World War II. In the course of the war, his father served in the Dutch resistance whose local chapter helped a New Zealand pilot escape to England. After the war, many emigrated from war-torn Europe to new lands of opportunity. Although his father prospered, idealism led him to emigrate to New Zealand.

In New Zealand, Avraham Gileadi went through a period of introspection, reevaluating his priorities and internalizing spiritual principles. After becoming religiously active and involved, he yet "sensed a lack of spiritual fulfillment." Israel's history in the Old Testament became the focus of his attention. He recognized what he believed to be "a partial fulfillment of prophecy in the modern State of Israel," which led to his desire to participate in it.

In 1968, Gileadi left New Zealand to settle in Israel, where he lived five years. Life in Israel soon involved him deeply in the Old Testament and its religious ties to Judaism. He states that "Judaism attracted me because of the unique manner in which the Jews view the Law and the Prophets. Among the Jews, I felt a depth of understanding that, as a Gentile, I had not hitherto known." In Israel, he settled in Jezreel. His studies in Israel also took him to an orthodox religious kibbutz, at which time he was formally received into the Jewish faith and became an Israeli citizen. The climax of his life as an orthodox Jew came when he studied at Yeshivat Hatfutzot, a rabbinic school in Jerusalem. While visiting a library in Israel, the librarian handed him a copy of the Book of Mormon and suggested he read it. Gileadi took the book to be polite and studied it out of curiosity, which led to his conversion to the Church of Jesus Christ of Latter-day Saints. He was baptized a member of the LDS Church in the Pool of Siloam, where the Bible records Jesus healing a blind man by having him wash his eyes in the pool (John 9:5–7). In 1973 Gileadi moved to the United States, where he married and raised a family of nine children.

Gileadi received academic degrees from Brigham Young University: a B.A. in University Studies (1975), a M.A. in Ancient Scripture (1977), and a PhD in Ancient Studies (1981) with Hugh Nibley as chair. During his academic years, Gileadi taught Hebrew, Religion courses, and an Honors Philosophy class in the literary analysis of the Book of Isaiah. He also sought out and studied with Professor R. K. Harrison, a renowned Old Testament scholar of Wycliffe College, University of Toronto, Canada, who was noted for his conservative theological position.

Being fluent in Hebrew, Gileadi worked with the Hebrew Masoretic Text, the Dead Sea Scroll of Isaiah, and the Septuagint Version to provide a translation of the Book of Isaiah intelligible in English that remains true to the Hebrew. He used lexical tools constantly to accurately convey every nuance of meaning in the original language, finishing his translation of Isaiah during his PhD program.

Academic career and church discipline
Gileadi was hired by BYU to produce footnotes clarifying translation problems in the Hebrew prophets for the LDS edition of the Bible, and he revised the Hebrew translation of the Book of Mormon for the Church's Translation Division. In 1981 he completed PhD in Ancient Studies from Brigham Young University, under the supervision of Hugh Nibley, with a dissertation entitled "A Bifid Division of the Book of Isaiah."

In 1988 Gileadi published The Book of Isaiah: A New Translation with Interpretive Keys from the Book of Mormon, followed in 1991 by The Last Days: Types and Shadows from the Bible and the Book of Mormon. Prominent LDS scholars including Hugh Nibley, Truman G. Madsen and Ellis Rasmussen praised his work. However, Gileadi's argument (present in both books and developed at length in the second) that the Isaiah prophecies pointed to a human "Davidic king" who would emerge in the last days, apart from Jesus Christ, was deemed controversial and clashed with previous LDS interpretations of Isaiah. A reviewer in the Review of Books on the Book of Mormon, while praising Gileadi's erudition and the beauty of his translation, noted that Gileadi's "[...] interpretation of Isaiah [...] diverges widely from previous Latter-day Saint commentary on Isaiah, including that of Bruce R. McConkie." Further, the reviewer contrasted McConkie's commentary in The Millennial Messiah with Gileadi's interpretation of Isaiah. The Last Days was pulled from the shelves of Deseret Book, an LDS owned company; the book was published by Covenant Communications, Inc.

In September 1993, Gileadi was disciplined by the LDS Church and excommunicated along with five others, a group known as the September Six. In 1996, Gileadi was re-baptized into the LDS Church after the church reversed its disciplinary action against him due in part to the oversight of Neal A. Maxwell. Gileadi later told the Salt Lake Tribune: "In my case — not a single charge was true or supported by evidence — and all mention of it was expunged from the church's records."

Today, Gileadi continues to research the writings of Isaiah and related scriptural texts. Gileadi is the author of ten books, a majority of them on the Book of Isaiah.

Works 

 Israel's Apostasy and Restoration: Essays in Honor of Roland K. Harrison (Grand Rapids, MI: Baker Book House, 1988). Twenty-four essays by evangelical and LDS scholars edited by Avraham Gileadi. Hardcover .
 The Book of Isaiah: A New Translation with Interpretive Keys from the Book of Mormon (Salt Lake City, UT, Deseret Book: first edition 1988; San Diego, CA: Hebron Books, second edition 2012). A beginner's guide to the Book of Isaiah for LDS readers. Softcover 
 The Last Days: Types and Shadows from the Bible and the Book of Mormon with foreword by Hugh Nibley (Salt Lake City, UT: Deseret Book, first edition 1991; Salt Lake City, UT: Argon Press, second edition 1998). For LDS readers: "Everything you always wanted to know about the gospel but were too lazy to find out"—Hugh Nibley. Softcover .
 The Literary Message of Isaiah  (San Diego, CA: Hebraeus Press, first edition 1994; second edition 2012). A ground-breaking literary approach to analyzing Isaiah's writings for Judeo-Christian readers. .
 The End from the Beginning: The Apocalyptic Vision of Isaiah with Isaiah Translation (San Diego, CA: Hebraeus Press, first edition 1997; second edition 2012). A layman's introduction to Isaiah's prophetic message for Judeo-Christian readers.
 Isaiah Decoded: Ascending the Ladder to Heaven (San Diego, CA:  Hebraeus Press, first edition 2002; second edition 2012). A comprehensive overview of Isaiah's prophetic message for Judeo-Christian readers. Softcover .
 Studies in the Book of Mormon (San Diego, CA: Hebron Books, first edition 2005; second edition 2012). Study guide for LDS readers. Softcover 
 Analytical Commentary of Isaiah (San Diego, CA: Hebraeus Press, 2006. 30-hour MP3 audio format). The best single companion available for Judeo-Christian listeners desiring to know Isaiah's prophetic message for our day.. 
 The Book of Isaiah: Analytical Translation with Comprehensive Concordance  (San Diego, CA: Hebraeus Press, 2012). A beautiful modern English rendering of the Book of Isaiah from the Hebrew Masoretic Text with a comprehensive concordance for facilitating word studies for Judeo-Christian readers. .
 Apocalyptic Commentary of the Book of Isaiah, Part One (San Diego, CA: Hebraeus Press, 2012). A verse-by-verse analysis of Isaiah's end-time prophecy of Isaiah 1–35 for Judeo-Christian readers. .
 Endtime Prophecy: A Judeo-Mormon Analysis (San Diego, CA: Hebraeus Press, 2018). His final major work, an analysis to help modern readers understand promises and pitfalls of understanding or ignoring the word of God. For Judeo-Christian readers.  .

References 

1940 births
American biblical scholars
American Latter Day Saint writers
Brigham Young University alumni
Brigham Young University faculty
Converts to Mormonism from Judaism
Dutch Latter Day Saints
Living people
Mormon studies scholars
Old Testament scholars
People excommunicated by the Church of Jesus Christ of Latter-day Saints
People from Orem, Utah
People from Sequim, Washington
Latter Day Saints from Utah
Latter Day Saints from Washington (state)
Dutch emigrants to New Zealand
New Zealand emigrants to Israel
Israeli emigrants to the United States
American people of Dutch descent
Converts to Judaism